Eva Lisa Larsdotter Ljung (born July 13, 1970 in Malmö, Sweden) is a Venezuelan-Swedish former beauty queen, who grew up in Barquisimeto and was Miss Venezuela in 1989, the official representative of her country to the Miss Universe pageant held in Cancún, México on May 23, 1989, where she was one of the Top 10 semifinalists.

References

External links
Miss Venezuela Official Website
Miss Universe Official Website
Mother Agency Mariela Centeno

1970 births
Living people
Miss Universe 1989 contestants
Miss Venezuela winners
People from Caracas
People from Malmö
Swedish emigrants to Venezuela
Venezuelan people of Swedish descent